The 2nd North-West Legislative Assembly was constituted after the 1891 North-West Territories general election which took place on 7 November 1891. The Legislative Assembly lasted from 1891 to 1894.

List of Members of the Legislative Assembly

Notes

References

Further reading 

 
 

002
1891 in Canada
1892 in Canada
1893 in Canada
1894 in Canada